Shell Building may refer to:

Shell Building (San Francisco), California
Shell Building (St Louis), Missouri
Shell Centre, London, England
One Shell Square, New Orleans, Louisiana
One Shell Plaza, Houston, Texas